Manganesepta hessleri is a species of sea snail, a marine gastropod mollusk in the family Fissurellidae, the keyhole limpets.

Description
The size of the shell reaches 2.6 mm.

Distribution
This marine species occurs in the northern part of the equatorial Pacific Ocean.

References

 McLean J.H. & Geiger D.L. (1998). New genera and species having the Fissurisepta shell form, with a generic-level phylogenetic analysis (Gastropoda: Fissurellidae). Contributions in Science, Natural History Museum of Los Angeles County 475: 1–32

External links
 

Fissurellidae
Gastropods described in 1998